Ricardo Kishna (born 4 January 1995) is a Dutch professional footballer who plays as a forward for ADO Den Haag.

Club career

Ajax
Born in The Hague, Kishna joined Ajax in 2010 from ADO Den Haag at 15 years old, where he had been active in the youth ranks from the age of 9 laying the foundation for his professional career. On 13 May 2011, Kishna signed his first professional contract with Ajax, joining the club until June 2014. He began the 2013–14 season playing for Ajax A1, the club's under-19 team, competing in the Nike A-Juniors Eredivisie and the UEFA Youth League. On 3 January 2014 it was then announced that Kishna, Jaïro Riedewald and Riechedly Bazoer would join the first team on its training camp in Turkey during the Winter transfer window. After making his debut with the first team in the Antalya Cup, a friendly tournament, on 11 January 2014 against Turkish side Trabzonspor, head coach Frank de Boer announced that Kishna would not be returning to the under-19 selection after the Winter break. But would join the reserves team Jong Ajax in the Dutch Eerste Divisie, while making appearances for the first team. On 15 January 2014 it was announced that Kishna had extended his contract with Ajax for an additional two seasons, now running until the Summer of 2016, with an option for an additional year.

He made his professional debut on 17 January 2014 playing for Jong Ajax in the 4–0 away loss against FC Emmen. He was substituted off in the match for Abdel Malek El Hasnaoui in the 59th minute. He scored his first professional goal for Jong Ajax on 10 February 2014 in a 4–1 home win over VVV-Venlo scoring in the 52nd minute. He then scored again in the following match against first place in the league table FC Dordrecht, leveling the score 1–1, and helping the reserves team to secure a point. On 19 February 2014 Frank de Boer announced that Kishna was selected as a member of the 18-man squad ahead of the UEFA Europa League match at home against Red Bull Salzburg, marking the first time he would be selected for the first team in a professional match. He then made his professional debut on 20 February 2014 against Red Bull Salzburg, replacing Kolbeinn Sigþórsson in the 60th minute in the 0–3 home defeat. He made his Eredivisie debut for the first team three days later in the 4–0 home victory over neighboring AZ, scoring on his league debut in the 61st minute, after being substituted on for Bojan Krkić in the 46th minute of the North Holland derby match.

Lazio
On 29 July 2015, Kishna joined Lazio on a four-year contract from Ajax. The reported transfer fee paid to Ajax was €4 million. He scored his first goal on his debut, a 2–1 win over Bologna on 22 August.

Lille (loan)
On 31 January 2017, Kishna joined Ligue 1 side Lille OSC on loan with an option given to Lille to sign him permanently.

ADO Den Haag (loan)
On 31 August 2017, Kishna signed for his former youth club ADO Den Haag on a season-long loan deal.
On 31 August 2018, Kishna joined ADO Den Haag for the second time until 30 June 2019. After three years out due to a knee injury, he finally returned to the pitch in November 2020 coming on as a substitute in an Eredivisie match against Heerenveen.

International career
Kishna made his debut for the Netherlands national team in the youth ranks, appearing for the under-15 selection in an International friendly match against Turkey U-15 on 8 December 2009. The match ended in a 2–1 victory at home for the Dutch. He then went on to make four more appearances for the under-15 side. He made his debut for the Netherlands U-16 side on 26 October 2010 in the Tournoi du Val-de-Marne in Paris, France, playing against France U-16 in a 1–2 away win. Making two further appearances, while scoring once.

Personal life
Born in The Hague, Kishna is of Surinamese-Dutch descent, with his father being of Indo-Surinamese origin and his mother from the Netherlands.

Career statistics

Club

1 Includes UEFA Champions League and UEFA Europa League matches.

2 Includes Johan Cruijff Shield and Supercoppa Italiana matches.

Honours

Club
Ajax
 Eredivisie: 2013–14
 Eusébio Cup: 2014

References

External links
Voetbal International profile 
Ajax Inside Profile
Ricardo Kishna at Topforward
Netherlands U15 stats at OnsOranje
Netherlands U16 stats at OnsOranje

1995 births
Living people
Dutch sportspeople of Surinamese descent
Dutch people of Indian descent
Sportspeople of Indian descent
Footballers from The Hague
Association football wingers
Association football forwards
Dutch footballers
Indian people of Dutch descent
Dutch expatriate footballers
Expatriate footballers in Italy
Expatriate footballers in France
Netherlands youth international footballers
Netherlands under-21 international footballers
Eredivisie players
Eerste Divisie players
Serie A players
Ligue 1 players
AFC Ajax players
Jong Ajax players
S.S. Lazio players
Lille OSC players
ADO Den Haag players